Picturehouse may refer to:

 Movie theater
 Picturehouse (company), a film distribution company in New York, active 2005–2008, which was relaunched in 2013
Picturehouse (band), an Irish pop band, active 1996–2004, which was reformed in 2013
Picturehouse Cinemas, a British chain of cinemas, which started in 1989
Picturehouse Entertainment, a British film distribution company, started in 2010 and owned by the cinema chain
The Picture House, Poundsbridge, a timber-framed house built in 1593, formally named Poundsbridge Manor